The 2021–22 season was the 128th season in the existence of FC Porto and the club's 88th consecutive season in the top flight of Portuguese football. In addition to the domestic league, Porto participated in this season's editions of the Taça de Portugal, the Taça da Liga, the UEFA Champions League and the UEFA Europa League.

Kits

Players

First-team squad

Out on loan

Transfers

In

Out

Loan in

Loan return

Loan out

Technical staff

References

FC Porto seasons
Porto
Porto
Porto
Portuguese football championship-winning seasons